Cleiton Augusto Oliveira Silva (born 3 February 1987) is a Brazilian professional footballer who plays as a striker for Indian Super League club East Bengal.

Club career

BEC Tero Sasana 
His career took off in the 2012 season when incoming Head Coach Andrew Ord signed him to BEC Tero Sasana on a 3-year deal. In his first season Cleiton won the Thai League T1 2012 Golden boot with 24 goals with Teerasil Dangda.

On 2013 he is winner Thai League T1 2013 Player of the month march and winner striker of the years award.

Muangthong United 
After short unsuccessful spell with Delfines in Mexico, in late 2014 he signed for Muangthong United in Thai Premier League and scored 5 goals during the second leg of the 2014 Thai Premier League.

Shanghai Shenxin 
Cleiton Silva transferred to China League One side Shanghai Shenxin.

Bengaluru FC 
In June 2020, Silva signed for Indian Super League club Bengaluru FC for one-year deal, with an option to extend for another year.

East Bengal 
In August 2022, Silva was announced as one of the five foreigners signed by East Bengal for the upcoming season.

On 28 August, he made his debut against Kolkata derby rival ATK Mohun Bagan in the Durand Cup, which ended in a narrow 1–0 loss. He came on as a half-time substitute for compatriot Eliandro. Six days later, he scored his first two goals for the club against Mumbai City, in a thrilling 4–3 win. He perfectly executed a free-kick and later the winner in the 81st-minute to hand East Bengal their first competitive win after seven months.

Club statistics

Honours 

Muangthong United
 Thai League T1 (1): 2016
 Thai League Cup (1): 2016
 Thailand Champions Cup (1): 2017

Chiangrai United
 Thailand Champions Cup (1): 2018

Individual
 Thai Premier League Top Scorer (2): 2012, 2016
 Thai Premier League Player of the Month (1): 2013
 Thai Premier League Striker of the Year (1): 2013

References

External links 

1987 births
Living people
Sportspeople from Minas Gerais
Brazilian footballers
Expatriate footballers in Thailand
Expatriate footballers in China
Brazilian expatriate footballers
Brazilian expatriate sportspeople in Thailand
Brazilian expatriate sportspeople in Mexico
Brazilian expatriate sportspeople in China
Madureira Esporte Clube players
Cleiton Silva
Cleiton Silva
Cleiton Silva
Shanghai Shenxin F.C. players
Cleiton Silva
China League One players
Association football forwards
Association football wingers
Expatriate footballers in India
Brazilian expatriate sportspeople in India
Bengaluru FC players
East Bengal Club players